Golam Bahri (also Romanized as Golām Baḩrī and Gholām Baḩrī) is a village in Nurali Rural District, in the Central District of Delfan County, Lorestan Province, Iran. At the 2006 census, its population was 1,048, in 241 families.

References 

Towns and villages in Delfan County